Ghagga is a town and a municipal committee in Patiala district in the state of Punjab, India. It is located on the Patiala - Patran road and is very near to the border of Haryana. Ghagga falls in the Shutrana constituency of Punjab. It is famous for the Ghagga Kothi that was owned by the erstwhile royal family of Patiala, which is now under the control of Punjab Police.

Prominent people

Sardar Ridha Singh Ji Akali of Ghagga village was the vice president of the Riyasat Parjamandal Party. Sardar Sewa Singh Thikriwala of Thikriwala village, was the president. This party was a part of the freedom struggle and wanted equal rights for the common man.

At that time, the British and the monarchy had imposed a lot of restrictions against the people of Punjab. There was no freedom of movement on the roads, which connected the villages to the main towns and cities. The Maharaja, on the other hand used these roads for his hunting pursuits and other expeditions. This, and numerous other violations against the lot of the Punjabi people, led to the formation of the Riyasat Parjamandal Party, which demanded basic rights for the natives of Punjab.

Sardar Ridha Singh Ji Akali Pannu  was actively involved in numerous activities for demanding basic rights for the common man in Punjab.

Dr. Kartar Singh Dang (Popularly known as "Papa Ji") was the lone doctor in this village from 1951 to 1992, served with dedication for more than 40 years helping out poor and needy. Master Hamir singh Ghagga [former minister] also belongs to this village

Demographics
 India census, Ghagga had a population of 25000. Males constitute 53% of the population and females 47%. Ghagga has an average literacy rate of 49%, lower than the national average of 59.5%: male literacy is 56%, and female literacy is 41%. In Ghagga, 15% of the population is under 6 years of age. Ghagga had many restaurants.

References

Cities and towns in Patiala district